Offline is the fifth studio album by the German rock band Guano Apes. It was released on 30 May 2014 by Epic Records/Sony Music labels.

Background
Recording sessions took place at Toolhouse Studios in Rotenburg an der Fulda, at Tonstudio 45 near Koblenz, at FuzzFactory Tonstudio in Berlin-Kreuzberg, at Transporterraum and at Popchop Studios in Berlin, at Katzbach Studio and at Z-Muzic. Production was primarily handled by Kurt Ebelhäuser and Philipp Hoppen. The album peaked at #8 in Germany, at #26 in Austria and at #31 in Switzerland. Its lead single "Close to the Sun" made it to #86 on the German charts.

Musically, the album is a continuation of its predecessor Bel Air, featuring a more polished, pop-influenced sound compared to the funk-influenced nu metal of the band's first three albums. German dubstep artist Sola Plexus worked with the band on the song "Jiggle" and remixed "Cried All Out" for the German "exklusiv edition" of the album.

Track listing

Personnel

Sandra Nasić – lyrics, vocals, vocal producer (tracks: 1-8, 10), producer
Henning Rümenapp – guitar, producer
Stefan Ude – bass, producer
Dennis Poschwatta – drums, producer
Daniel James Traynor – lyrics (track 2)
Jo Perry – lyrics (track 2)
Lindy Robbins – lyrics (track 2)
Robin Grubert – lyrics & producer (track 6)
Jerome Vazhayil – lyrics (track 9)
Sola Plexus – vocal producer (track 9)
Philipp "Philsen" Hoppen – producer & engineering (tracks: 1, 2, 6, 7)
Kurt Ebelhäuser – producer & engineering (tracks: 3-5, 8-10)
Kristian Nord – producer (track 6)
Simon Jäger – co-producer (tracks: 3, 5, 8-10), engineering (tracks: 3-5, 8-10)
Mirco 'Godi' Hildmann – co-producer (tracks: 4, 8, 9)
Michael Tibes – engineering (tracks: 1, 2, 6, 7)
Robert Stephenson – assistant engineering (tracks: 1, 2, 6, 7)
Robin Schmidt – mastering
Darcy Proper – mastering (track 2)
Super An Der Spree – creative direction, artwork
Julia Schliewe – additional artwork
Jill Greenberg – cover
Harry Weber – photography

Charts

References

External links

2014 albums
Guano Apes albums